Stewart Robertson (born 22 May 1948, Glasgow) is a Scottish conductor. He attended the Royal Scottish Academy of Music and Drama and Bristol University. He studied piano in London with Denis Matthews, and conducting with Otmar Suitner at the Mozarteum Academy and Hans Swarowsky at the Vienna Academy.

Career 

Robertson became the youngest conductor to lead a performance at the Cologne Opera since Herbert von Karajan. He has served as music director of the Zurich Ballet and Scottish Opera Touring Company. He has conducted New York City Opera productions broadcast on Live from Lincoln Center.

In the early '80's, he served as conductor of the San Jose Symphony Youth Orchestra.

In addition to being an active pianist, Robertson is a broadcast writer and lecturer on music who has been seen and heard on National Public Radio, Public Broadcasting Service, BBC, and Swiss-Italian radio and television.

Robertson was music director of Glimmerglass Opera from 1988 to 2006.  From 1998 to 2009, he served as Artistic Director and Principal Conductor of the Florida Grand Opera in Miami.  He has also been a professor of orchestral studies at Florida International University.  Since 2005, he is the conductor of the Atlantic Classical Orchestra in Florida.  From 2005 to 2008, he was artistic director and principal conductor of Opera Omaha.

Robertson's commercial recordings include Richard Rodney Bennett's opera The Mines of Sulphur (Chandos) and Stephen Hartke's opera The Greater Good (Naxos), both of which featured performers from Glimmerglass Opera.

Robertson and his wife Meryl have two children.

References

External links
 Allied Artists agency biography
 Interview with Stewart Robertson, 27 May 1994

Scottish conductors (music)
British male conductors (music)
1948 births
Living people
Florida International University people
Alumni of the Royal Conservatoire of Scotland
Alumni of the University of Bristol
University of Music and Performing Arts Vienna alumni
Mozarteum University Salzburg alumni
21st-century British conductors (music)
21st-century British male musicians